Gurulmundi is a rural locality in the Western Downs Region, Queensland, Australia. In the  Gurulmundi had a population of 7 people.

Geography 
The ridgeline of the Great Dividing Range forms the northern and western boundaries of the locality.

The Leichhardt Highway enters the locality from the south (Kowguran) and exits to the north-west (Guluguba).

Gurulmundi railway station is an abandoned railway station on the Wandoan railway line.

History 
The locality's name is an Aboriginal word meaning low hills.

Gurulmundi Provisional School opened on 27 February 1928. On 1 January 1944 it became Gurulmundi State School. It closed on 10 May 1965.

In the  Gurulmundi had a population of 7 people.

Amenities 
The Gurulmundi branch of the Queensland Country Women's Association meets at the Gurulmundi School of Arts Hall.

Attractions 
Gurulmundi is known for its wildflowers.

References 

Western Downs Region
Localities in Queensland